Axiocerses argenteomaculata is a butterfly in the family Lycaenidae. It was described by Arnold Pagenstecher in 1902. It is found in Burka, Ethiopia.

References

Butterflies described in 1902
Axiocerses
Endemic fauna of Ethiopia
Butterflies of Africa